Pardosa elegans is a species of wolf spiders (family Lycosidae) found in Russia.

References 

 Pardosa elegans at eu-nomen.eu
 Pardosa elegans at the World Spider Catalog

elegans
Spiders of Russia
Spiders described in 1875